The Assiti Shards series is a fictional universe invented by American author Eric Flint. It is a shared universe concerning several alternate history worlds, related to a prime timeline. The defining characteristic of the fictional universe is the existence of the "Assiti Shards effect", and the impact that strikes by Assiti Shards have on characters in the stories.

Assiti Shard
The Assiti Shards work by displacing bits of the world into other times and places, exchanging it with that which was there. These "shards", according to the fictional universe backstory, are waste byproduct of artworks created by the sophisticated and curious alien race known as the Assiti. The various stories involve shards striking the Earth and timeshifting characters into different periods and places.

Multiverse

Ring of Fire

The first literary work in this fictional universe was 1632 (pub. 2000) by Eric Flint. This work led to a series of works that branched off this, into the Ring of Fire series (aka 1632 series). Most of the works in this fictional universe fall within this particular timeline. This timeline involves the displacement and exchange of the late 1990s mining town of Grantville, West Virginia with a piece of 1630s medieval southern Germany (in Thuringia).

Although 1632 was written as a stand-alone novel in 2000, Flint had planned several other universes using the Assiti Shards story premise. However, the sensation and interest engendered by the 1632 novel's publication subsequently caused the other works to be delayed while the 1632 series was developed.

This timeline was opened up to third-party authors, and open submissions. These are collected and published as the Grantville Gazettes, an online anthology magazine, focused solely on the Ring of Fire timeline. It is similar to Analog Science Fiction Science Fact, in that it publishes fiction and nonfiction. In this case, the nonfiction relates to the Ring of Fire timeline. The best stories, some commissioned, are collected into the Ring of Fire print anthology series.

Many of the major novels in the series are collaborations between Eric Flint and other authors. The series is considered broad and expansive.

Time Spike series

A second timeline was introduced by Eric Flint when he released the novel Time Spike with co-author Marilyn Kosmatka in 2008. This timeline involves several different periods in the history of Middle America, starting with a maximum security prison in the 2000s, along with Amerinds on the Trail of Tears, Spanish Conquistadors, a city of the Mound Builders, and some Paleoindians—all displaced into the Cretaceous period age of dinosaurs. The Assiti Shard in this universe took pieces from different geologic time periods from the Devonian period through the present and jumble them together in an affected area while placing this mixture on a Cretaceous earth.

Time Spike novel

The first work in the series, the 2008 novel Time Spike, was written by Eric Flint and Marilyn Kosmatka. The main thread of the novel is about state maximum-security prison located in economically depressed downstate Illinois from the first decade of the 21st century being transported to a cretaceous Earth during the middle of an evening shift change so that the prison would (theoretically be) twice the normal number of prison staff available at the prison at any given time but before regular administrators, such as the warden and other section heads, show up. A secondary thread covers 19th century Cherokees being forcible escorted by U.S. Army troops from their homes in Georgia to their exile in would later become Oklahoma along the Trail of Tears. A tertiary thread is about the scientists who were left behind on the original 21st century Earth who are analyzing the cause behind the Assiti Shards displacements and their fight against an American government who is trying to keep the event at the prison (and the previous displacement at Grantville) secret from the general public for unknown purposes.

Time Spike: The Mysterious Mesa

For over a decade from volume 39 in 2012 to volume 99 in 2022 of The Grantville Gazette, Garrett W. Vance had been writing an ongoing serial in the Time Spike universe that included  Time Spike: The Good Samaritan and the Hanged Man, Time Spike: Evening in Cahokia, Time Spike: The Mysterious Mesa, and Time Spike: First Cavalry of the Cretaceous.   Vance's stories were reissued as a single volume novel titled Time Spike: The Mysterious Mesa  in 2018, and was followed by a second volume titled Time Spike: The First Cavalry of the Cretaceous in 2022, both published by Eric Flint's Ring of Fire Press. To date, these two books are the only other major works that is written in the Time Spike universe.

The story concerns the adventures of cavalry scout Nate Tucker of the newly formed Republic of Texas serving as a soldier in the United States Army Cavalry who was escorting the Cherokee during the Trail of Tears incident. Tucker befriends a Spaniard formerly serving in Hernando de Soto's 16th century expedition across North America.  The two men encounter pre-Columbian Native Americans from different time periods ranging from the Neolithic to the Mississippian culture period.

It is not clear if Vance will be able to continue this series after the immediate closure of both The Grantville Gazette and the Ring of Fire Press that had occurred after Eric Flint's death in 2022.

Dove's Time Spike short stories
From 2012 to 2017, author David W. Dove wrote three unrelated short stories in the Time Spike universe that were published in volumes 39, 41, and 74 of the Grantville Gazette.

Queen of the Seas series

This book series involved the transport of the 21st century cruise ship Queen of the Seas to the 4th century BCE Mediterranean and how 21st century technology affects the successors to Alexander the Great's vast empire.

The Alexander Inheritance
This novel by Eric Flint with Paula Goodlett and Gorg Huff was released by Baen in July 2017.  The cause of the displacement was described as "An Assiti Shard transposes a modern cruise liner into the Mediterranean just after the death of Alexander the Great." The passengers and crew include a historian, a Norwegian cruise ship captain, a French first officer for navigation who was a competitive pistol marksman while previously serving in the French Navy, and an American congressman, who are thrown back in time during the period of the Diadochi, when one of world's largest empires was being split apart by civil war.

The Macedonian Hazard 
The Macedonian Hazard, the second novel in the Queen of the Seas series was released in January 2021.  The book picks up where The Alexander Inheritance had left off with when Olympias, Alexander's mother, shows up at the ship.

The Sicilian Coil
The Sicilian Coil is the third novel set in the Queen of The Seas series released in September 2021. This side-line novel, which does not directly involve the main characters, is published by Ring of Fire Press. This novel covers events in the region of Sicily and the Italian Peninsula that coincide with the events in the novel The Macedonian Hazard, from the viewpoints of characters who have left the Queen of the Seas to work with Rome and other cities in the region providing technical knowledge and radio communication links.

Other time threads

The Crossing
The Crossing is a 2022 novel by Kevin Ikenberry set in the Assiti Shards milieu, about a time displaced 2008 ROTC squad sent back to the 1776 Battle of Trenton.

An Angel Named Peterbilt
An Angel Named Peterbilt As of October 2022 Gorg Huff co-author for An Angel Named Peterbilt posted on FaceBook that he and Paula Goodlett had completed the novel and turned it in to Baen Publishing for release in 2024.

As of December 3, 2022 Paula Goodlett who has co-authored several novels with Eric Flint and Gorg Huff reported on Baen's Bar author forums that An Angel Named Peterbilt has been expanded to novel length by herself and Gorg Huff. The draft copy has been sent to Baen's Books for editing and final work and is now expected for a spring 2024 release.

See also

 The Emberverse series
 Nantucket series
 A Time Odyssey
 List of books published by Ring of Fire Press

References

External links
 BAEN Free e-library
 1632.org
 "Virginia's Grid" of Up-time Characters
 Slush Pile
 Baen's Bar, center of the Assiti Shard collaboration

Book series introduced in 2000
Fictional universes
Parallel universes in fiction